Sport is an important part of the culture of the Australian state of Queensland. Golf is the most played organised sport and touch football is the most played team sport. Netball is the most popular female sport, while rugby league is the most watched sport. Queensland also has two AFL teams, the Queensland Reds in Super Rugby, and two National Basketball League teams, the Brisbane Bullets, Cairns Taipans and Delta Gymnastics. The largest sporting event held in Queensland annually is the Gold Coast 600 motor race.

Australian rules football

Australian Football has a long history in Queensland. The first foray made by the then VFL came in the form of the Brisbane Bears, who began playing Premiership matches in 1987. Despite some rocky times in the northern state, the game now appears to be entrenched within the Queensland, thanks to a hat-trick of AFL Premiership wins from 2001-2003. The introduction of the Gold Coast Suns in 2011 highlights the game's growth in Queensland.

Basketball
Basketball is a popular sport in Queensland, and offers an alternative to outdoor sport during rainy weather. Since the National Basketball League's inception in 1979, at least one team has been based in Queensland. Queensland has two current NBL teams:

Brisbane Bullets – based at Nissan Arena, Brisbane – founded in 1979
Cairns Taipans – based at the Cairns Convention Centre, Cairns – founded in 1999

Cricket

Cricket is popular in Queensland. Many domestic and international matches are held at the Gabba.
The Queensland Bulls and the Brisbane Heat are based in Brisbane and represent Queensland in Australia's domestic cricket tournaments:

Sheffield Shield, 4-day matches with first-class status, since the 1926/27 season
Marsh One-Day Cup, a one-day (50 over per side) tournament with List-A status, since its inception in 1969/70
Big Bash League, a 20 overs per side tournament, since its inception in 2011/12

Rugby league

Rugby league is the most spectated sport in Queensland. Queensland Rugby League has been in operation since 1908, creating strong roots in both city and regional communities. There are currently four teams in the National Rugby League competition, two of which have been part of the NRL since its inauguration in 1998:

 Brisbane Broncos - based at Suncorp Stadium, Brisbane, Queensland – founded in 1988
 Gold Coast Titans - based at Cbus Super Stadium, Gold Coast Queensland – founded in 2007
 North Queensland Cowboys - based at Queensland Country Bank Stadium, Townsville, Queensland – founded in 1995
 Dolphins (NRL) based at Kayo Stadium, Redcliffe, Queensland - founded in 1947, joined In 2023

The other major rugby league team is the Queensland Maroons who play New South Wales Blues in the fiercely contested three game State of Origin competition. The Maroons have recently won their third straight Origin series, as well as their eleventh from the past twelve.

The other major state based competition is the Queensland Cup.

Rugby Union

Rugby Union is a major sport in Queensland with more than 55,000 registered players in 210 clubs and 235 schools across the state. The first games were played in 1876, and Queensland has been represented by the Queensland Reds since 1882, who currently compete in the Super Rugby competition.

In 2011, the Reds won the Super Rugby Championship in front of more than 52,000 fans. They repeated this feat in the 2021 Super Rugby AU Final.

Swimming 
Swimming is also a popular sport in Queensland, with a majority of Australian team members and international medalists hailing from the state. At the 2008 Summer Olympics, Queensland swimmers won all six of Australia's gold medals, all swimmers on Australia's three female (finals) relays teams were from Queensland, two of which won gold.

At the 2004 Summer Olympics, 2005 and 2007 World Long Course Swimming Championships, Australia won both the 4 × 100 m freestyle and medley relays. In five of these teams, three out of the four swimmers were from Queensland, and in the medley relay in 2007, all were from Queensland.

Triathlon 
Triathlon has been a popular sport in Queensland since the early 1980s with the state three times hosting the ITU World Championships 
 in addition to: the Noosa Triathlon - the world's largest triathlon (also the country's longest-lasting event at the same venue), Mooloolaba Triathlon, Hervey Bay Triathlon and the Gold Coast Triathlon to name but a few.

Major events

1982 Commonwealth Games

Motto:	The Friendly Games
Nations participating:	46
Athletes participating: 1,583
Events: 141 events in 12 sports
Dates: 30 September to 9 October
Mascot: Matilda (Kangaroo)

1994 World Masters Games
Motto: The Challenge Never Ends
Nations participating 71
Athletes participating: 23,659
Events: 30 sports
Dates: 26 September to 8 October

2001 Goodwill Games

Nations participating: 70
Athletes participating: 1,300
Events: 155 in 14 sports
Dates: 29 August to 9 September

2018 Commonwealth Games

Motto: Share the Dream
Nations participating: 71
Athletes participating: 4,426
Events: 275 in 18 sports
Dates: 4 April to 15 April
Mascot: Borobi (Koala)

2019 INAS Global Games

Nations participating: 50
Athletes participating: 814
Events: 11 sports
Dates: 12 October to 19 October
Mascot: Lori (Lorikeet)

Other events
Birdsville Races - annual horse races at Birdsville which were first held in 1882.
Brisbane to Gladstone yacht race
Gold Coast Indy 300 - open-wheel motor race at the Surfers Paradise Street Circuit held between 1991 and 2008.
Gold Coast 600
International Rally of Queensland
Queensland 400
Quicksilver Pro and Roxy Pro
State of Origin - Best of three rugby league games between New South Wales and Queensland which began in 1980.
Annual Bledisloe Cup Rugby Union matches - Australia vs New Zealand

Queensland Sports Awards
Each year the Queensland Sport Awards are held. The major award is the Sport Star of the Year:
1995 Susan O'Neill - Swimming
1996 Susan O'Neill - Swimming
1997 Michael Doohan - Motorcycling
1998 Michael Doohan - Motorcycling
1999 Loretta Harrop - Triathlon
2000 Susan O'Neill - Swimming
2001 Grant Hackett - Swimming
2002 Matthew Hayden - Cricket
2003 Patrick Johnson - Athletics
2004 Jodie Henry - Swimming
2005 Grant Hackett - Swimming
2006 Emma Snowsill - Triathlon
2007 Matthew Hayden - Cricket
2008 Stephanie Rice - Swimming
2009 Greg Inglis - Rugby league
2010 Stephanie Gilmore - Surfing
2011 Samantha Stosur - Tennis
2012 Sally Pearson - Athletics
2013 Adam Scott - Golf
2014 Mat Belcher - Sailing
2015 Jason Day - Golf
2016 Cate Campbell - Swimming
2017 Jeff Horn - Boxing
2018 Cate Campbell - Swimming
2019 Ashleigh Barty - Tennis

Teams in national competitions

Brisbane-based

Outside Brisbane

Sporting Venues

Brisbane

Outside Brisbane

See also

Sport in Brisbane
Sports on the Gold Coast, Queensland
Rugby league in Queensland

References